| tries = {{#expr: 
 
 + 3 + 2 + 5 + 6  + 4 + 4 + 5 + 4
 + 4 + 3 + 2 + 6  + 6 + 1 + 4 + 2
 + 6 + 5 + 5 + 4  + 3 + 2 +10 + 3
 + 5 + 7 + 3 + 3  + 8 + 1 + 8 + 0
 + 6 + 5 + 5
}}
| top point scorer = 
| top try scorer = 
| venue = Sixways Stadium
| attendance2 = 12,024
| champions =  Northampton Saints
| count = 1
| runner-up =  Gloucester
| website = 
| previous year = 2008–09
| previous tournament = 2008–09 EDF Energy Cup
| next year = 2010–11
| next tournament = 2010–11 LV Cup
}}
The 2009–10 LV Cup (styled as the LV= Cup) was the 39th season of England's national rugby union cup competition, and the fifth to follow the Anglo-Welsh format.

Northampton Saints were crowned champions after beating Gloucester in the final at Worcester's Sixways Stadium.

The structure of the competition was altered from previous years. The competition continued to consist of the four Welsh Celtic League teams and the twelve Guinness Premiership clubs, arranged into pools consisting of three English teams and one Welsh. However, the new format saw teams guaranteed two home and two away pool matches, with teams in Pools 1 and 4 playing each other and teams in Pools 2 and 3 playing each other. The competition took place on international fixture dates during the Autumn Internationals and Six Nations, with the aim of allowing teams to develop their squad players.

On 29 October 2009, little more than a week before the start of this season's competition, British insurer LV was unveiled as the new sponsor.

Pool stage

Points system
The points scoring system for the pool stage was as follows:
4 points for a win
2 points for a draw
1 bonus point for scoring four or more tries in a match (TB)
1 bonus point for a loss by seven points or less (LB)

The ranking criteria were:
 If two or more clubs in the same pool end the pool stage equal on match points, then the order in which they have finished will be determined by:
i. the greater number of matches won by the club and
ii. if the number of matches won is equal, the club with the greater total number of tries scored and
iii. if the total number of tries scored is equal, the club with the greater points difference (points scored for, less points scored against) and
iv. if the points difference is equal, the club with the fewer number of red cards and
v. if the number of red cards is the same, by the toss a coin.

Pool 1 v Pool 4

Round 1

Round 2

Round 3

Round 4

Pool 2 v Pool 3

Round 1

Round 2

Round 3

Round 4

Knockout stage

Qualification criteria
The top teams from each pool qualify for the knockout stage. The pool winners were decided by the following criteria:
1. The pool winner will be the club with the highest number of match points in each pool. The pool winners will be ranked 1 to 4 by reference to the number of match points earned in the pools.
2. If two or more clubs in the same pool end the pool stage equal on match points, then the order in which they have finished will be determined by:
i. the greater number of matches won by the club and
ii. if the number of matches won is equal, the club with the greater total number of tries scored and
iii. if the total number of tries scored is equal, the club with the greater points difference (points scored for, less points scored against) and
iv. if the points difference is equal, the club with the fewer number of red cards and
v. if the number of red cards is the same, by the toss a coin.

Each of the four qualifying clubs shall be ranked as above and shall play each other as follows: 
Semi-final 1 - 1st ranked club v 4th ranked club
Semi-final 2 - 2nd ranked club v 3rd ranked club
The first club listed in each of the semi-final matches shall be the home club.

Semi-finals

Final

See also
2009–10 English Premiership (rugby union)
2009–10 Celtic League

External links
 Official website
 Anglo Welsh Cup on Premiership Rugby website
 Tables
 Fixtures and results
 Anglo Welsh Cup website

References

2009–10 in Welsh rugby union
2009–10 English Premiership (rugby union)
2009-10
2009–10 rugby union tournaments for clubs